111th Street may refer to:

111 Street, Edmonton, Alberta, Canada

New York City Subway stations

 111th Street (IRT Flushing Line); serving the  train
 111th Street (BMT Jamaica Line); serving the  train
 111th Street (IND Fulton Street Line); serving the  train
 111th Street (IRT Second Avenue Line); demolished